In probability theory, the Chung–Erdős inequality provides a lower bound on the probability that one out of many (possibly dependent) events occurs. The lower bound is expressed in terms of the probabilities for pairs of events.

Formally, let  be events. Then

 

The inequality was first derived by Kai Lai Chung and Paul Erdős (in, equation (4)). It was stated in the form given above by Petrov (in, equation (6.10)).

References 

Probability theorems
Probabilistic inequalities
Paul Erdős